Sonqorabad or Sanqorabad may refer to:
 Sonqorabad, Alborz
 Sonqorabad, East Azerbaijan
 Sonqorabad, Hamadan
 Sonqorabad, Kermanshah
 Sonqorabad, Kohgiluyeh and Boyer-Ahmad
 Sonqorabad, Razavi Khorasan